During the 2005–06 season, Lincoln City competed in Football League Two.

Competitions

Football League Two

League table

Results

FA Cup

Football League Cup

Football League Trophy

Notes 

 1.Lincoln City goals listed first.

References

Lincoln City F.C. seasons
Lincoln City